How Mine Football Club was a football club based in Bulawayo, Zimbabwe. The club played in the Zimbabwe Premier Soccer League before surrendering their license before the 2018 season. The team was sponsored by the How gold mine.

How Mine appeared in the 2017 Chibuku Cup final, losing 3–1 to Harare City.

Stadium
The team played in the 20,000-seat Luveve and White City Stadium in Bulawayo, Zimbabwe.

League participations
Zimbabwe Premier Soccer League: 2013–2017
Zimbabwean Second Division: ?-2013

Sponsors
How Mine holdings
League sponsor
Delta Beverages
 matches viewable on Supersport

References

External links
Soccerway Profile
Soccer24

Football clubs in Zimbabwe
Sport in Bulawayo